93 (Le Cateau) Battery Royal Artillery is an equipment Battery to exist in 5th Regiment Royal Artillery "The Yorkshire Gunners" and is based at Marne Barracks, Catterick, North Yorkshire.The Battery currently operates in a Surveillance and Target Acquisition role.

History 

37 Field Battery merged with 47 Field Battery in 1938 to form 37/47 Field Battery RFA. They then spent the early stages of World War II in Sub-Saharan Africa, before travelling to South-East Asia as part of the 1944 Burma Campaign.

On 1 April 1947, 37/47 Field Battery RFA was renamed 93 Field Battery RA in Gunclub Barracks, Kowloon, Hong Kong as part of 25th Field Regiment RA.

24 November 2011, 93 (Le Cateau) Battery re-established as a Battery within 5th Regiment Royal Artillery (The Yorkshire Gunners), based in Marne Barracks, Catterick.ref></ref>

In September 2012 the Battery deployed to Afghanistan on Operation HERRICK 17 as the Theatre Surveillance and Target Acquisition Battery. The Battery were employed in a plethora of key locations within Helmand Province and provided vital ISTAR to the Brigade.

References

External links
The Battle of Le Cateau
First World War - Battle of Le Cateau
Old Comrades Association
5th Regiment Royal Artillery

See also
List of Royal Artillery Batteries

Royal Artillery batteries
1740 establishments in Great Britain